Mike Malet (born February 28, 1948) is a former American football and lacrosse coach.  He was the first head football coach for the Marist College football program when it was granted varsity status. The Red Foxes program coached by Ron Levine existed from 1965 to 1977 on the club level. Malet finished his 11-year head football coaching career at Marist by passing the reins over to Rick Pardy with an overall record of 30–68.

Head coaching record

Football

References

1948 births
Living people
Marist Red Foxes football coaches
Marist Red Foxes men's lacrosse coaches